Arizona State Route 75, abbreviated as SR 75, is a state highway in eastern Arizona that stretches from its junction with U.S. Route 191 and State Route 78 near Greenlee County Airport south to its junction with U.S. Route 70 in Duncan. It is primarily a shortcut for north and southbound traffic between Duncan and Clifton.

Route description
The southern terminus of SR 75 is located at a junction with U.S. Route 70 in Duncan. It initially heads northeast from this intersection but curves back towards the northwest. As it continues towards the northwest, the highway passes through the communities of Sheldon, Apache Grove and York. The northern terminus of SR 75 is located at a junction with U.S. Route 191 and SR 78 in Three Way near the Greenlee County Airport.

History
SR 75 was designated as a state highway between Duncan and Clifton in 1932.  In 1935, the route was only a gravel road, but by 1938, the southern half had been paved. The northern half remained a gravel road. The highway was shortened to its present northern terminus when U.S. Route 666 (now known as U.S. Route 191) was relocated to an alignment further south. The section north of the new junction with U.S. Route 666 was transferred into Route 666.

Junction list

References

External links

SR 75 at Arizona Roads

075
Transportation in Greenlee County, Arizona
1075